= Ren Bumei =

Chinese dissident

Ren Bumei (born June 8, 1967) is a Chinese dissident who is also known as Hu Chunlin (胡春林). He was born at Heilongjiang, China. With his pen-name Ren Bumei, he is a Canada-based writer working for the Web-based magazines Democratic China and ChinaEForum. Hu, as he is affectionately called, formed the Chinese Free Democracy Party and was awarded the Outstanding Democracy Activist Award by the California-based Chinese Democracy Education Foundation.
